The Party of Free Change (PLS) was a satirical political party in Romania, founded by  and with  as its first president. Its name, message and symbols were overt references and homages to Ion Luca Caragiale, the classical Romanian humorist; building on an inside joke, its agenda praised opportunism and even encouraged members to leave the party. However, the PLS was also criticized for its alleged links with the ruling National Salvation Front (FSN), and for being one of the many groups which split the vote in the general election of 1990 and local ones of 1992. It won a seat in Chamber, taken by Cazimir, and several positions on local councils.

Changes in the electoral legislation signaled the PLS' decline—a rapid one, after Cazimir defected to the Social Democratic Party (PDSR; now PSD) in 1992. No seat was won by the party in the general elections of that year, and, although technically undissolvable according to its statutes, it eventually disappeared before the 1996 election. Theater director Mircea Cornișteanu was its second and last president.

History

Creation
The PLS began existence shortly after the December 1989 revolution, which toppled the communist regime and restored multiparty democracy. It was founded by editorial cartoonist Octavian Andronic, with a manifesto published on February 6, 1990 in Libertatea daily; literary critic Ștefan Cazimir adhered "by phone" on February 7. The name was adapted from Ion Luca Caragiale's comedy O scrisoare pierdută (1884), which Andronic had just watched on Romanian Television, in the Liviu Ciulei adaptation. In the original text, it already appears as a double entendre: one of the key characters, Nae Cațavencu, declares himself liber schimbist, technically "a supporter of free trade", but this can also be read as "easy changer"—one who changes views or convictions easily, without scruples. One of the main principles of the party was granting the status of honorary membership to anyone who changed their allegiance from one political party to another.

Cazimir, often mistaken as the party founder, had had a political involvement with the Romanian Communist Party and, earlier, the Union of Communist Youth, to which he adhered ca. 1949. In December, he had been caught up in the revolutionary events, first as an unwilling participant in the communist counter-manifestation, then as a supporter of the street movement in Bucharest. Overall, the new enterprise was entirely built on his deadpan humor (for which he was already famous) and his deep familiarity with Caragiale's work—he was recognized as a Caragiale expert since the 1960s. During January, Cazimir pondered entering politics as an independent, promising his constituents to "read out from Caragiale as often as possible". Another founding member, Mircea Cornișteanu, produced and directed Caragiale plays, and is described as one of Caragiale's "feverish admirers".

Due to its literary pedigree leading back to the 1880s, the PLS called itself an "historic party". Tributes for the writer extended into other areas of party activity: the PLS motto was Caragiale e cu noi! ("Caragiale is with us!"); its hymn ended with another paraphrase from O scrisoare...: Trădare fie, dar s-o știm și noi! ("Let's have betrayal, but let's be aware of it!"). Its official tribune, founded by Andronic and called Răcnetul Carpaților ("The Roar of the Carpathians", after Cațavencu's fictional gazette), ran fragments from Caragiale's political satire as genuine political news and commentary. Reviving Cațavencu's rhetoric, perceived enemies of the party where addressed as reprobabili ("detestable people"), and allies as venerabili or stimabili ("venerable" or "esteemed people").

The PLS organizing conference took place on February 18 at the People's Art College, on Cosmonauților Street, Bucharest. It was here that Cazimir was made president, with Andronic's blessing—the latter, being chief editor of the independent Libertatea, did not wish to become politically involved. Under Cazimir, the party would not declare its ideology, but parodied serious parties for their quick adoption of "centrism". In this context, it declared itself a party "on the outer edge", because "two cannot be at the center without stifling or crushing each other. Plus, one can get a better perspective from the edge". However, Cazimir claimed, its platform only ever stood out from that of serious groups "in being grammatically correct". While "most other groups cultivate unwitting humor", PLS statutes endorsed "witting humor".

Performance
Soon after its official registration on March 1, the PLS was invited by the governing National Salvation Front (FSN) to join Romania's temporary legislature, or Provisional National Unity Council (CPUN). Its one seat there was taken by Cazimir. With Cazimir as president, seconded by Gheorghe Boșman, the party held its first congress at Cervantes High School, Bucharest, shortly before the 1990 general elections. The PLS benefited from the liberal electoral law of that period, which required registrations to have only 251 signatures. Politician and scholar Cristian Preda places the PLS in a category of ephemeral groups created in that interval, alongside a Romanian Democratic Popular Realist Revolutionary Party and a Party of Heroes Killed for the Freedom of Living Heroes Maimed by the Barbarian Bullets.

Unlike these highly localized projects, the PLS ran candidates in 26 precincts, and formed small but active county organizations—according to Cazimir, these were mostly run by divorcée ladies. The PLS received around 0.3% of the vote in both the Chamber of Deputies and Senate elections. Although it failed to win any senatorial mandates, it took a single seat in the Chamber, which went to Cazimir. In his early speeches at Cervantes, Cazimir had joked that they only ran in elections "because I was tired of things going smooth." He used his speaking time in Chamber mainly to popularize the sayings of Caragiale and Ion Creangă, as well as his own epigrams. At times, Cazimir also expressed mild criticism of the FSN as the party of "dead roses", and commented negatively on the June 1990 Mineriad, braving threats of violence from the Front's working-class electorate. However, journalist George Baltac believes that the PLS "deliberately" helped the FSN to fragment the voting weight for the National-Peasantist opposition with "an explosion of minuscule parties." He notes that Cazimir, as a "left-wing intellectual", had a personal relationship with FSN leader Ion Iliescu. Likewise, commentator Andrei Manolescu argues that "[Cazimir's] humor and irony turned into actual opportunism."

Although the legislation updated in 1992 provided an election threshold, which harmed its chances, the PLS continued to be active, and staged high-profile stunts. In one such event, its delegation to Brussels made Manneken Pis an honorary party member. The party also contested the February 1992 elections for local councils: it fielded 75 candidates for the General Council of Bucharest (the maximum allowed by law) and endorsed Tudor Popescu as its candidate for Mayor. In the end, it elected several councilors throughout the country, and only one at Bucharest.

Cazimir defected to Iliescu's Social Democratic Party (PSD) later that year, and in the elections of September the party's vote share fell to 0.1%, resulting in it losing its single seat in Chamber. Interviewed in 2010, Cazimir suggested that his move to the PSD was a continuation of PLS goals. Cornișteanu, who succeeded him as ad-interim president, argues that Cazimir "betrayed" the party statues, and notes that he was listed as an "abandoned member". The PLS was ultimately disbanded in 1996 when new rules required that any party should have at least 10,000 members, or, according to Cornișteanu, when it could no longer support itself financially. However, Cazimir claims, the PLS was undissolvable and still technically existed by 2010, because its statutory clauses encouraged all members to join other parties.

Electoral history

Legislative elections

References

External links
Partidul Liber Schimbist, Romanian Chamber of Deputies record

Defunct political parties in Romania
Joke political parties
Ion Luca Caragiale
Political parties established in 1990
Political parties disestablished in 1996
1990 establishments in Romania
1996 disestablishments in Romania